Shedville is an unincorporated community in Green Township, Randolph County, in the U.S. state of Indiana.

History
An old variant name of the community was called Brinckley. A post office was established under this name in 1881, and remained in operation until 1901.

Geography
Shedville is located at

References

Unincorporated communities in Randolph County, Indiana
Unincorporated communities in Indiana